Frans van der Klink (11 June 1928 – 14 August 1976) was a Dutch footballer. He played in one match for the Netherlands national football team in 1950.

References

External links
 

1928 births
1976 deaths
Dutch footballers
Netherlands international footballers
Place of birth missing
Association footballers not categorized by position